Zamfirescu is a Romanian surname. Notable people with the surname include:

 Duiliu Zamfirescu (1858–1922), novelist, poet, short story writer, lawyer, nationalist politician, journalist, diplomat
 Florin Zamfirescu (born 1949), theatre and film actor and director
 George Mihail Zamfirescu (1898–1939), theatre director and playwright
 Elisa Leonida Zamfirescu (1887–1973), an early woman engineer
 Mihail Zamphirescu (1838–1878), poet

See also 
 Zamfir
 Zamfirești (disambiguation)

Romanian-language surnames
Patronymic surnames